An animal café, also known as a pet café, is a place where people can see and interact with various animals such as cats, dogs, rabbits, owls, or sheep while they enjoy the food and drinks. The first animal café was established in Taiwan in 1998. The concept of this café was a cat which is very popular and familiar. Since the cat café was established, a number of cafes for various animals have shown up.

History 

Taiwan created the very first animal café in 1998 which has the concept of a cat. Thereafter, the idea was brought to Japan before spreading to the rest of the world. A Japanese tourist visited Taiwan and discovered the potential of the animal café before coming back to Japan to establish the first animal café in Osaka in 2004, where the concept flourished. Today, Japan is known as the country with the most animal cafes in the world. Although there are some countries in Europe and America that also have animal cafes such as Spain, Germany, France, United States, Australia. The United Kingdom etc., animal cafes are still more popular in Asian countries yet. When the animal café was first created in Taiwan and Japan, it was mainly for people who just want to spend time with animals. However, there are also several animal cafes for abandoned or lost animals these days as well. Such animal cafes are used as a way to help these abandoned or lost animals by providing them not only home and food but also the opportunity to be adopted by customers of the café.

Types 
As individuals prefer different animals, there are a number of various animal cafes in the world.

Cat café 

Due to the fact that the first animal café was a cat café in Taiwan, the cat café is one of the most common animal cafes. A cat café is like a basic animal café that can be found easily especially in Asian countries like South Korea, Taiwan, and Japan. A number of different types of cats can be found at the cat café. Normally it separates the play area where people can play with cats and the regular area where people just drink and eat food without cats.

Some of the cat cafes create a good interaction between cats and humans. some cat cafes look after and feed cats who were stray cats or abandoned by people. Cat cafes provide those cats home, food and affection. Also, customers who visit a cat café regularly and are interested in raising cats can be potential adopters of cats. Cat café's staffs try to find a perfect adopter for cats.

Dog café 

A dog café is another very common animal café that can be found easily. People who like dogs would enjoy their time with a number of different kinds of dogs at the dog café. A dog café is more active, noisy, and filled with motion compared to a cat café due to the characteristics of dogs.

Like a cat café, a dog café also provides an adoption system to customers who have the ability to raise them. The dog café can be seen as a sanctuary providing a good experience for customers to make a connection with abandoned dogs, and they probably adopt dogs.

There is a dog café in Los Angeles that has the goal of finding the perfect home for shelter dogs. Customers enjoy the time with dogs and, potentially, become a new owner of shelter dogs.

Raccoon café 

A more unusual form of animal café is the raccoon café. There is a raccoon café in South Korea in which people can play with raccoons while they drink and eat the food. Because this café is divided into two rooms, people can choose to play with a raccoon or just enjoy their food and drinks. Because raccoons have sharp claws and teeth, there is a warning that the café is not responsible for any damage from raccoons.

Hedgehog café 
In 2016, a hedgehog café was opened in Tokyo for the first time in the world. Because of the strangeness, many foreigners have visited the café. At the same time, some people criticize this café from a viewpoint of animal protection.

Sheep café 
There is a sheep café in South Korea which is established in 2011. This café is the first sheep café in the world which has two sheep named Sugar and Honey. It is allowed to feed them some food. People can watch the sheep as they enjoy their meal. However, the sheep don't stay at the café during the summer season due to weather issues.

Rabbit café 
Rabbit café is located in Japan. Most rabbits are not wandering around like other cats and dogs at cafes but they are often kept in their cages. However, this café sometimes provides a chance to walk around a nearby place with rabbits.

Bird café 
There are a few different kinds of bird cafés in Japan such as owls, parrots, falcons, hawks, etc. They are not dangerous and do not attack people because they are well trained by the staff. The staff show customers the way they handle and feed the birds in a safe way. Also, people can take a picture with the birds if they have permission from the staff.

Reptile café 
In Cambodia, there is a famous reptile café in which people can see a number of different species of reptiles such as turtles, snakes, iguanas, and spiders. People can relax, eat, drink, and learn about a number of different species of reptiles at the café. They can also take pictures with a variety of reptiles. The owner opened up this café in 2018 with permission from Cambodia's Ministry of Forestry, Fisheries and Agriculture. He regards the animal welfare as the primary concern at the café.

Controversy 
There are several arguments objecting animal cafés, mostly from a viewpoint of animal protection.
 Some animal experts say that animal cafés might provide some positive effects to animals, but they are more likely to encourage people to buy animals than pay attention to animal welfare. 
 Some people argue that the way the animal cafes operate their business is very harmful to animal safety because some animals are not quite suited for the lifestyle at the café. 
 Some visitors of animal cafes in Japan express their concerns for the safety and welfare of the birds. 
 Japanese animal rights activists also argue that bird cafes abuse birds for the entertainment of humans. As a result, the Japanese government passed a much stricter Animal Protection Law which strengths the new rules and restricts trading hours of animal cafes. The stricter regulations are intended to make sure that those animals at the cafes have appropriate human treatment and care.

There are also cases of crimes against animal welfare in animal cafés. The owner of a cat café in Thailand was arrested by police due to disobedience against the Animal Protection Law. Seven cats died at his café due to poor safety care. Also, such welfare and safety problem can be found in South Korea as well. For example, animals in the cafes were not allowed to sleep until the cafes shut the door late at night. Such animal safety problems are generated due to the absence of regulations on animal cafes in South Korea because animal cafes are a relatively recent phenomenon.

There has also been some cases where customers who have been injured by animals at the café complained about the café's safety policy when the owner of the café do not take any responsibility for injuries.

References

See also 
Coffeeshop
Animal welfare
Animal protectionism

Types of coffeehouses and cafés
 Animals in entertainment
Animal rights
 Animal welfare
Japanese culture
 Theme restaurants
 Taiwanese inventions
1998 introductions